Tezcatlipōca (tehs-cah-tlee-poh'-cah) is an EP by Tubelord. This is the first release post Our First American Friends which showcases the new line-up since ex-bassist Sean Bamberger left in 2009, with new members James Elliot Field and Tom Coulson-Smith. The EP consists of three songs and one bonus track that was released on the 16 August 2010 by Hassle Records.

One single "Bazel" was released from the EP on 26 February 2011

Track listing

Personnel
Tubelord
 Joseph Prendergast - guitar, lead vocals
 Tom Coulson-Smith - bass guitar
 David Catmur - drums, backing vocals, percussion
 James Elliot Field - piano, keyboard, percussion

Additional personnel 
 Mikey Glenister – cornet on "Ratchet"

References

2010 EPs
Tubelord EPs
albums produced by Steve Albini
Hassle Records albums